Borjan (Macedonian and ) is a South Slavic given name and surname. It may refer to:

Milan Borjan (born 1987), Canadian footballer
Borjan Canev (born 1973), Macedonian conductor

See also
Boštjan

Serbian surnames